For the sexual fetish focused on urination, see Urolagnia.

Golden Shower is an electronic music duo from São Paulo, Brazil, consisting of Markus Karlus and Kevin Rodgers.

Their 2000 music video, Video Computer System, was the winner of the MTV Brasil Video Music Awards, in the category of Best Electronic Music Video.

References
 Interview with Golden Shower, November 13, 2000.

External links
 Golden Shower official website
 Lobo official website
 Video Computer System music video (QuickTime required)
 Total Control music video

Brazilian electronic musicians